Got That Feeling! is the fifth album led by American jazz vibraphonist Johnny Lytle which was recorded in 1963 for the Riverside label.

Reception

The Allmusic site awarded the album 4 stars stating "Got That Feeling! is exactly what it set out to be -- groove-oriented and infectious, but swinging, improvisatory, and imaginative. The material on this LP isn't difficult to absorb; accessibility was Lytle's goal, and he accomplishes that goal".

Track listing
All compositions by Johnny Lytle except as indicated
 "Got That Feeling!" - 4:50  
 "Pow-Wow" (Nat Adderley, Joe Zawinul) - 2:38  
 "In the Wee Small Hours of the Morning" (Bob Hilliard, David Mann) - 3:17  
 "Big John Grady" - 3:28  
 "The Breeze and I" (Ernesto Lecuona, Al Stillman) - 4:59  
 "It Ain't Necessarily So" (George Gershwin, Ira Gershwin) - 4:26  
 "Lela" - 4:30  
 "Love Is Here to Stay" (Gershwin, Gershwin) - 3:44  
 "The Soulful One" - 5:07

Personnel 
Johnny Lytle - vibraphone  
Milton Harris - organ
Milt Hinton - bass
William "Peppy" Hinnant - drums

References 

1963 albums
Johnny Lytle albums
Riverside Records albums
Albums produced by Orrin Keepnews